Bend Gate is an outdoor 1998 Cor-ten steel sculpture by Lee Kelly, installed in Bend, Oregon, United States. The work was acquired by the nonprofit organization Art in Public Places.

See also

 1998 in art
 List of public art in Bend, Oregon

References

External links
 

1998 establishments in Oregon
1998 sculptures
Buildings and structures in Bend, Oregon
Outdoor sculptures in Oregon
Sculptures by Lee Kelly
Steel sculptures in Oregon